Baglamukhi or Bagalā is the female form of a personification of the mahavidyas (great wisdom/science), a group of ten Tantrik deities in Hinduism. Devi Bagalamukhi smashes the devotee's misconceptions and delusions (or the devotee's enemies) with her cudgel. The word "Bagala" is derived from the word "Valga" (meaning – bridle or to rein in) which, became "Vagla" and then "Bagla". The Devi has 108 different names (some others also call her by 1108  names). Bagalamukhi is commonly known as Pitambari in North India, the goddess associated with yellow color or golden color. She sits on golden throne having pillars decorated with various jewels and has three eyes, that symbolises that she can impart ultimate knowledge to the devotee. 

Bagalamukhi is one of the ten forms of the Devi, symbolising potent female, primeval force.

The main temples dedicated to Bagalamukhi or Bagala Devi are located at Bhagalamukhi dhevi Temple Shivampet, Telangana,Bagalamukhi Temple, Nalkheda Madhya Pradesh, Bugiladhar, Ghuttu Uttarakhand, Kamakhya Temple, Guwahati, Assam , Baglamukhi temple of Lalitpur, Nepal and of Banghandi, Kangra, Himachal Pradesh.

Iconography
Another interpretation translates her name as "Kalyani". In Kubjika Tantra there is a reference to yet another interpretation of the meaning of the name ‘Bagala’. In the initial chapter of the text, there is a verse – ‘Bakare Baruni Devi Gakare Siddhida Smrita. Lakare Prithivi Chaiba Chaitanya Prakrirtita’ (‘Ba’, the first letter of the name – ‘Bagala’, means ‘Baruni’ or ‘She Who is filled with the intoxicating mood to vanquish the demon’. ‘Ga’, the second letter, means ‘She Who grants all kinds of divine powers or siddhis and successes to human beings’. ‘La’, the third letter, means ‘She Who is the foundation of all kinds of sustaining powers in the world like the earth and is Consciousness Herself’.

Two descriptions of the goddess are found in various texts: the Dwi-Bhuja (two-handed), and the Chaturbhuja (four-handed).
The Dwi-Bhuja depiction is the more common and is described as the "Soumya" or milder form. She holds a club in her right hand with which she beats a demon, while pulling his tongue out with her left hand. This is one of the boons for which Bagalamukhi's devotees worship her. Other Mahavidya goddesses are also said to represent similar powers useful for defeating enemies, to be invoked by their worshippers through various rituals.

Bagalamukhi is also called Pitambaradevi, Shatrubuddhivinashini and Brahmastra Roopini and she turns each thing into its opposite.

The Tantrasara describes her iconography: Bagalamukhi sits in a golden throne in the midst of an ocean in an altar. Her complexion is yellow (golden). Clad in yellow clothes, she is adorned by a garland of yellow flowers and decked with yellow (golden) ornaments. She pulls the tongue of a demon by her left hand, while raising the right hand to strike him with a club. Another description says that she has four arms and a third eye. A yellow crescent moon adorns her forehead.

Though generally depicted with a human head, the goddess is sometimes described to have a head of a crane and sometimes depicted ridding a crane. Sometimes, she is described associated with other birds: having a duck-head or a nose of a parrot.

Etymology and other epithets 

Kinsley translates Bagalamukhi as "she who has the face of a crane". Bagalamukhi is rarely depicted with a crane-head or with cranes. Kinsley believes that the crane's behaviour of standing still to catch prey is reflective of the occult powers bestowed by the goddess.

Another interpretation suggests that Baglamukhi is a corruption of the word Valgamukhi; valga means "bridle" or "bit". Like the bridle or bit – placed in the mouth – is used to direct a horse, Bagalamukhi gives the supernatural power of control over one's foes. In this context, Bagalamukhi is she "whose face has the power to control or conquer".

Bagalamukhi is known by the popular epithet Pitambara-devi or Pitambari, "she who wears yellow clothes". The iconography and worship rituals repeatedly refer to the yellow colour.

Legend
In the Satya Yuga (the first epoch in Hindu cosmology), a great storm started destroying Creation. The god Vishnu was disturbed and performed austerities to appease the goddess Parvati on shore of Haridra Sarovar, the lake of turmeric. Pleased with Vishnu, the goddess appeared and brought forth her manifestation Bagalamukhi from the lake. Bagalamukhi calmed the storm, restoring order in the universe.

Another tale records that a demon named Madan acquired Vak-siddhi, by which whatever he said came true. He misused it to trouble humans and murder people. The gods beseeched Bagalamukhi. The goddess grabbed the demon's tongue and immobilized his power. Madan requested the goddess that he be worshipped with her; the goddess granted him this boon, before slaying him.

Symbolism and associations 
Bagalamukhi is strongly associated with the yellow colour. She dresses in yellow clothes and ornaments. Various texts describe her affinity to the colour; yellow is an integral part of her worship rituals. Bagalamukhi is propitiated with yellow offerings by devotees dressed in yellow, seated on a yellow cloth. Yellow turmeric bead rosary are used in her japa (repetition) of her names or mantra (invocation). The colour yellow is linked to the Sun, gold, the earth, grain and fire, signifying auspiciousness, bountifulness and purity. The yellow turmeric is associated with marriage. This is why goddess Bagalamukhi is also known as Pitambhara devi.

Bagalamukhi is praised as the giver of supernatural powers (siddhis) or magical powers (s meaning good fortune, prosperity, wealth)

In ‘Bagalamukhistotratram’, a part of ‘Rudrayamala’ (a famous Tantra work), there are hymns in praise of the powers of Goddess Bagalamukhi –

Worship

Kamakhya Temple in Guwahati, one of the primary centers of Tantricism, consists of shrines for each of the Mahavidyas, one of which is dedicated to the Goddess Bagalamukhi, located a few hundred metres away.
Major temples to the goddess are situated in the Pathankot Mandi highway NH20 at Kotla and Bankhandi Himachal Pradesh in the north, and at village Badowan near Mahilapur districtt Hoshiarpur Punjab India and at Nalkheda at Agar Malwa district in Madhya Pradesh and Pitambara Peeth in Datia and DusMahavidhya Temple at Nikhildham Bhojpur -Bhopal Madhya Pradesh. In South India there is a temple at 
Bagalapeetam, Eraiyur Road, Vallakottai in Kanchipuram district in Tamil Nadu. Sree suryamangalam, Kallidaikurichi, Papankulam village in Tirunelveli district in Tamil Nadu.

A lesser known temple of the goddess is situated in Somalapura (Kalyani) of Sindhanur taluk, Raichur district of North Karnataka. It is believed to be a powerful Bagulamukhi Sidhdha Shakti Peeth. As per local legends, the temple was built by a great yogi after goddess' sakshaatkara fell in love with him. She promised to preside in the temple. As per another legend, the temple was built by great yogi Shri Chidanandavadhoota around 300 years ago. He composed 'Shree Devi Charitre', a popular text in Karnataka. Her prayers are said to pacify Brihaspati.

In Virupaskhi, a small village next to Mulabagil of Kolar district Karnataka, another shrine dedicated to the goddess, as part of temple complex of Virupakshi temple. As per folklore, the Virupaskha linga was installed by great sage Atri Maharshi, father of Shriguru Dattatreya. The linga changes its color in 3 ways from sunrise to sunset. It is believed that King Vikramaditya built the Bagulamukhi temple at Virupakshi.

The Bagalamukhi Temple, Bankhandi, HP situated in the village of Bankhandi in Kangra district, Himachal Pradesh is a prominent place of worship of the goddess, thronged by huge crowds during fridays and other festive seasons.

A temple devoted to Bagalamukhi is located in the Newar city of Patan near Kathmandu, Nepal, the country where worship of tantric goddesses had royal patronage. The territory of this temple in Patan has several other shrines dedicated to Ganesha, Shiva, Saraswati, Guheswar, Bhairava, etc.

See also
Devi
Mahavidya
Bagalamukhi Temple, Nalkheda
Bagalamukhi Temple, Bankhandi, HP

References

Bibliography

 
  
 
 

Hindu goddesses
Forms of Parvati
Mahavidyas